Setapak is a mukim in Gombak District, Kuala Lumpur, Malaysia. Formerly a tin-mining and rubber estate  area, in Malay tapak means 'step' so Setapak means 'one step', probably referring to the close proximity of the suburb to Kuala Lumpur. Another explanation of the origin of its name traces to its historical roots.

History
The earliest inhabitants of Setapak were the aborigines (orang asli), and the Minangkabaus. On 12 April 1884 Frank Swettenham, the British Resident of Selangor pleaded for the re-appointment of Batu Tapak as the headman of the aborigines living in that area, and hence the name Setapak, in honour of the headman.

Geographical definition
The northern limit of Setapak is Gunung Bunga Buah; its north-eastern limit is Genting Sempah on the Pahang border; to the east is Bukit Dinding and to the south-east is the Rifle range. The state constituency of Gombak Setia roughly corresponds to the boundaries of the mukim of Setapak; before 1974 it also includes what is today the parliamentary constituencies of Wangsa Maju and Setiawangsa.

The Gombak River with its source in Gunung Bunga Buah, is the main river flowing through the mukim. Setapak consists of Gombak town, Kampung Padang Balang, Kampung Baru Air Panas and a number of other villages.

Today, what is regarded as 'Setapak' consists of the township of Wangsa Maju, as well as the first few kilometres of Jalan Pahang and some surrounding areas. The Titiwangsa Recreational Park is located just south of Setapak. Loke Yew Hill is a place of major historical interest in this town. Named after the Chinese philanthropist, this hill contains ruins of a fortress surrounding the dilapidated villa which belonged to the Loke family. It is also the burial ground for the Loke family.

In 1961 the Zoological society was formed, and the National Zoo of Malaysia (Zoo Negara) in Setapak was officially opened by the Prime Minister on 16 November 1963.

Member of Parliament/ State Assembly

Education 

Tunku Abdul Rahman University College (TARUC)
Institute CECE
VTAR Institute
Al Diwan International Centre for Teaching Arabic (at Taman Melati Utama)
Setapak High School
Mun Yee Primary School
Chong Hwa Primary School
Chiao Nan Primary School
Sekolah Sri Utama

Public transportation 

The Kelana Jaya Line has five LRT stations in the Setapak region -  Gombak LRT station,  Taman Melati LRT station,  Wangsa Maju LRT station,  Sri Rampai LRT station and the  Setiawangsa LRT station.

In the future, the whole area will be served by an elevated station on the MRT Circle Line under the name of  Setapak MRT station.

Kumpool Vanpool ride-sharing service to Wangsa Maju LRT Station also available here.

Governmental Institutions 

Puspakom Kuala Lumpur
JPJ Wilayah Persekutuan
Department of Immigration (Malaysia) Wangsa Maju Branch

Attractions

 The P. Ramlee Memorial is located at Taman P. Ramlee (formerly Taman Forlong)
 Royal Selangor Pewter factory
 The Ayer Panas Hot Springs is located in Ayer Panas, Setapak
 Masjid Zaid bin Haritsah, Kampung Sungai Mulia - Beautiful roadside mosque
  Padang Balang Minangkabau Traditional Village
 Surau Tinggi Kampung Bandar Dalam - Old traditional Malay mosque
 Choo Sian Temple (聚仙廟) - elaborate and beautiful Chinese temple
 Setapak Central (formerly KL Festival City)

Incidents 
Setapak has been categorised as a hot spot for drug activities in Kuala Lumpur. The Malaysian authorities had in the past caught several drug abusers in the suburb.

A lecturer from Palestine was shot dead in Setapak in front of Idaman Puteri Condominium on 21 April 2018 at 6am. The attack was widely condemned by Malaysians.

References

External links 
 Rapid KL Bus Routes

See also
 Kampung Padang Balang

Suburbs in Kuala Lumpur